Archaeobdella is a genus of annelids belonging to the family Erpobdellidae.

The species of this genus are found in Europe.

Species:

Archaeobdella esmonti

References

Annelids